Shalkar is a district of Aktobe Region in Kazakhstan. The administrative center of the district is the town of Shalkar. Population:

Geography 
The Zhylandysay river flows through the territory of the district. The Lesser Barsuki Desert lies in the district.

History 
The Chelkar district was formed as part of the Aktobe province on October 21, 1921. July 5, 1922 was transformed into Chelkar district. In 1928, the district was recreated as part of the Aktobe District. In 1930, he passed into direct subordination to the Kazakh ASSR. In 1932 he moved to the Aktobe region. On March 10, 2000, by decree of the President of Kazakhstan the transcription of the name of Chelkar district in Russian was changed to Shalkar district.

References

Districts of Kazakhstan
Aktobe Region